Adidas Samba is an athletic shoe manufactured by German multinational Adidas. It is among Adidas' most popular shoes, being the second highest selling Adidas design ever with over 35 million pairs sold worldwide, behind the Stan Smith model. It has been produced in a variety of color schemes, yet the original black with three white stripes is by far the most popular. The shoe features a tan gumsole that distinguishes it from other Adidas shoes.

Overview 
The shoe was first produced in 1949 to enable football players to train on icy, hard ground (hence the suction design on the gumsole).  Its original design featured the classic three stripes, as well as the gold trefoil on the foldable tongue. As years progressed, the Samba evolved into the Samba Millennium (which was made without the extended tongue) and the Samba '85. Classic models of the shoe are still in production, under the name Classic M. The original model is sometimes used for training, street play, and futsal.

In popular culture 

The popularity of the Adidas Samba as a soccer shoe has caused it to move into popular culture, mostly worn as a fashion sneaker, and it makes many appearances in movies and on television. Some of these appearances include: 

 Owen Wilson's character Randy Dupree wears a pair of Adidas Samba K (a classic model that uses kangaroo leather) virtually the whole time in the 2006 film You, Me, and Dupree.
 The song "Olé" by The Bouncing Souls features the lines: Lace your Sambas, get on out/Off we go to kick it about.
 Shia LaBeouf's character Sam Witwicky wears a pair of black Sambas in the 2009 film Transformers: Revenge of the Fallen.
 Sean Astin wears a pair of black Sambas in 1993 film Rudy.
 The shoe was a favourite in the early 1980s Liverpool football casuals/scally subculture; indeed the shoe is a youth icon in the UK along with Reebok Classics.
 A few characters can be seen wearing Sambas during the training scenes in the 2000 film Remember the Titans, including Coach Herman Boone (Denzel Washington) who appears to be wearing a pair of Adidas Samba K's.
 Kevin Seconds, lead singer of American hardcore punk 7 Seconds is an avid fan of classic black Sambas and wears them at all live performances.
 Ashton Kutcher wears Adidas Sambas in the 2010 film Valentine's Day and on That '70s Show.
 Freddie Mercury, the lead singer of Queen wore Adidas Hercules wrestling boots, similar to white Sambas during Live Aid in 1985.
 Eddie Murphy as Axel Foley is seen wearing a pair of white Adidas Country with green stripes in the 1984 film Beverly Hills Cop.
 Adrian Grenier's character Vincent Chase, in HBO's Entourage, is seen wearing white Sambas with black stripes in Season 6 episode 10 "Berried Alive".
 Joseph Gordon-Levitt's character Wilee in the 2012 film Premium Rush can be seen wearing the Adidas Samba OG variant throughout the film. 
 Jamie Bell's character Joey Cassidy in the 2012 film Man on a Ledge could be easily recognized wearing black Adidas Samba OG's throughout the story.
 Steven Yeun's character Glenn wears a pair of black Sambas in several episodes of AMC's The Walking Dead.
 Taylor Lautner's character Cam wears a pair of black Sambas at the beginning of the 2015 film Tracers.
 Donald Glover's character Earn wears white Sambas in the second season of Atlanta.
 Dave Hill Hucknall’s top drinker wears Adidas Samba.
 Gary Windass in Coronation Street.
 Aiden Scotcher in Waterloo Road.
 Ewan McGregor wears a pair of burgundy adidas Samba Super Suede in Trainspotting in the role of Mark Renton, 1996.
 In the Italian adult animated Netflix series Tear Along the Dotted Line, the main protagonist Zero (who is based on the series' creator Zerocalcare) wears a pair of black Sambas.

References

External links
 

Adidas
Sports footwear